Cacodylic acid is an organoarsenic compound with the formula (CH3)2AsO2H. With the formula R2As(O)OH, it is the simplest of the arsinic acids. It is a colorless solid that is soluble in water.

Neutralization of cacodylic acid with base gives cacodylate salts, e.g. sodium cacodylate. They are potent herbicides.  Cacodylic acid/sodium cacodylate is  a buffering agent in the preparation and fixation of biological samples for electron microscopy.

History 
In the 18th century it was found that combining  and four equivalents of potassium acetate gives a product called "Cadet's fuming liquid" which contains cacodyl oxide,  and cacodyl, .

Early research into "cacodyls" was reported by Robert Bunsen at the University of Marburg. Bunsen said of the compounds, 

"The smell of this body produces instantaneous tingling of the hands and feet, and even giddiness and insensibility... It is remarkable that when one is exposed to the smell of these compounds the tongue becomes covered with a black coating, even when no further evil effects are noticeable". 

His work in this field led to an increased understanding of the methyl group.

Cacodyl oxide, is often considered the first organometallic compound to be prepared synthetically.

Cacodylic acid and its salts were incorporated into herbicides by large variety of manufacturers under numerous brand names. APC Holdings Corp. sold cacodylic acid and its salts under the Phytar brand name. The variety used in Vietnam (as Agent Blue) was Phytar 560G.  "Agent Blue,"  a mixture of cacodylic acid and sodium cacodylate was used during the Vietnam War as a defoliant.

Reactions
Cacodylic acid is a weak acid with a pKa of around 6.25.

Cacodylic acid can be reduced to dimethylarsine , which is a versatile intermediate for the synthesis of other organoarsenic compounds:

Health effects 
Cacodylic acid is highly toxic by ingestion, inhalation, or skin contact. The U.S. EPA states that all forms of arsenic are a serious risk to human health and the United States Agency for Toxic Substances and Disease Registry ranked arsenic as number 1 in its 2001 Priority List of Hazardous Substances at Superfund sites. Arsenic is classified as a Group-A carcinogen.

See also 

 Arsenic
 Arsine
 Cacodyl oxide

References

Further reading
 
 Elschenbroich, C; Salzer, A. (1992) Organometallics, 2nd Edition

External links 
 Case Studies in Environmental Medicine - Arsenic Toxicity
 Bunsen Biography

Arsenical herbicides
Organoarsenic compounds
IARC Group 2B carcinogens